Józef Teodorowicz (25 August 1864 – 4 December 1938) was the last Armenian Catholic Archbishop of Lviv. All of his family were of Armenian origin and had lived for centuries in Poland.

Teodorowicz finished a grammar school in Stanislaviv then studied with the faculty of law at Chernivtsi University in Bukovina. During his studies he suffered a crisis of belief. A year later he enrolled in the Major Roman Catholic Theological Seminary in Lviv.  In 1887 he became a priest and, after the death of Archbishop Izaak Mikołaj Isakowicz of Lviv, in 1901 was named to succeed him. He is widely respected among Poles for his religious and social work.

Teodorowicz died in Lviv, where he was buried at the Cemetery of the Defenders of Lwów. When the city was occupied by Soviet forces during World War II his remains were transferred to a family cemetery to save them from profanation.  The first Soviet occupation of 1939-41 prevented the nomination of a successor and during the subsequent occupations and destructive policies of Nazi Germany and Stalin's Soviet Union  the city's 700-year-old Armenian community was completely destroyed.

In 2008, the Polish Sejm recognized him as "heroic patriot".

In 2011, his remains were transferred and reburied in the Cemetery of the Defenders of Lwów.

External links

Arcybiskup ormiański Józef Teofil Teodorowicz — An article by Tadeusz Isakowicz-Zaleski. 
 Archbishop Józef Teofil Teodorowicz
 Eminent Armenian archbishop reburied in Lviv
 Armenian Catholic Archbishop Józef Teodorowicz reburied in Lviv (in Russian)

1864 births
1938 deaths
People from Ivano-Frankivsk Oblast
People from the Kingdom of Galicia and Lodomeria
Chernivtsi University alumni
Austrian jurists
Armenian Catholic archbishops
Armenian Eastern Catholics
Austro-Hungarian Armenians
20th-century Eastern Catholic archbishops
Polish bishops
Polish Eastern Catholics
Polish people of Armenian descent
Burials at Lychakiv Cemetery